Melvin B. Geliebter is an American businessman, political donor and philanthropist.

Early life

Career
Geliebter co-founded RSV Sport, a women's jeans manufacturer, with his wife. In 2002, they sold it to the Jones Apparel Group (now known as Nine West Holdings) for US$310 million. He later served as the Chief Executive Officer of Sun Apparel.

Geliebter is the holder of three patents pertaining to jeans production.

Political activity
Geliebter is a large donor to the Republican Party. He donated US$25,900 to Meg Whitman's gubernatorial campaign and US$2,400 to Carly Fiorina's senatorial campaign in 2010.

Additionally, he donated US$2,500 to Tom Leppert and US$5,000 to Boehner in 2011. The same year, he donated US$10,000 to Tim Pawlenty's presidential campaign in 2011. He donated US$30,600 to the National Republican Senatorial Committee in 2012. He also donated US$5,200 to Mimi Walters's congressional campaign in 2014.

Philanthropy
Through the Geliebter Foundation, he donated between US$25,000 and US$49,999 to the USC Norris Comprehensive Cancer Center at the University of Southern California in 2006.

Personal life
Geliebter has a wife, Susan. They reside in Beverly Park, a gated community in Los Angeles, California.

References

Living people
People from Los Angeles
Businesspeople from California
American company founders
American fashion businesspeople
American chief executives
Year of birth missing (living people)